Ornithopus, the bird's-foot, is a genus of flowering plants in the family Fabaceae.

Selected species:
Ornithopus compressus—yellow serradella
Ornithopus micranthus
Ornithopus perpusillus—little white bird's foot
Ornithopus pinnatus—orange bird's foot
Ornithopus sativus—serradella, common bird's foot

References

External links
USDA: Ornithopus in North America

Loteae
Fabaceae genera